Poliomintha is a genus of flowering plants in the mint family, Lamiaceae.  It is native to the southwestern United States, Haiti, and northern Mexico.

The name is derived from the Greek words πολιός (polios), meaning "grey," and μίνθη (minthe), meaning "mint." Members of the genus are commonly known as rosemary-mints.

Species
 Poliomintha bustamanta B.L.Turner - Nuevo León; also called Mexican oregano
 Poliomintha conjunctrix Epling & Wiggins - Baja California
 Poliomintha dendritica B.L.Turner - Coahuila
 Poliomintha glabrescens A.Gray – Leafy rosemary-mint - Big Bend region of western Texas, Coahuila
 Poliomintha incana (Torr.) A.Gray – Frosted mint, hoary rosemary-mint - Chihuahua, western Texas, New Mexico, Arizona, Utah, southwestern Colorado, San Bernardino County in California
 Poliomintha longiflora A.Gray - Nuevo León, Coahuila, Haiti; also called Mexican oregano
 Poliomintha maderensis Henrard - Coahuila
 Poliomintha marifolia (S.Schauer) A.Gray - Hidalgo

References

External links

USDA PLANTS Profile

Lamiaceae
Lamiaceae genera
Flora of North America